Formon is a village in the Les Cayes commune of the Les Cayes Arrondissement, in the Sud department of Haiti. It is located 4.5 km southwest of Les Cayes on Route Nationale #2.

References

Populated places in Sud (department)